Dischistodus melanotus, commonly known as the black-vent damsel, is a species of fish found in the western Pacific Ocean.

References

melanotus
Fish described in 1858
Taxa named by Pieter Bleeker